Konrad Jałocha (born 9 May 1991) is a Polish professional footballer who plays as a goalkeeper for Polish club GKS Tychy.

Honours

Club
Legia Warsaw
Ekstraklasa: 2013–14

Arka Gdynia
 Polish Cup: 2016–17

External links
 
 

1991 births
Footballers from Warsaw
Living people
Polish footballers
Association football goalkeepers
Legia Warsaw players
Legia Warsaw II players
Chojniczanka Chojnice players
Arka Gdynia players
GKS Tychy players
Ekstraklasa players
I liga players
II liga players
III liga players